Divine is a surname. Notable people with the surname include:

Charles Divine (1889–1950), American poet and playwright
David Divine (1905–1987), South African writer
Dreuxilla Divine (born 1974), Puerto Rican drag queen
Father Divine (c. 1876 – 1965), American religious leader
Neil Divine (1939–1994), American astrophysicist
Roscoe Divine (born 1947), American middle-distance runner
Samuel Raymond Divine (born 1953), Liberian politician and banker